The Men's giant slalom competition of the Squaw Valley 1960 Olympics was held on February 21 at Squaw Valley.

The defending world champion was Toni Sailer of Austria.

Results

References 

Men's giant slalom
Winter Olympics